Stephen Musota is a Ugandan lawyer and judge, on the Court of Appeal of Uganda, which doubles as the country's Constitutional Court. He was appointed to the court of appeal on 8 February 2018.

Background and education
He was born in Uganda, circa 1959. He studied law at Makerere University, Uganda's largest and oldest public university, graduating in 1982 with a Bachelor of Laws (LLB) degree. The next year, he received a Diploma in Legal Practice, from the Law Development Centre, in Kampala, the national capital. He was then admitted to the Uganda Bar.

Work experience
In 1984, he was appointed as a Magistrate Grade One, rising to the level of Senior Principal Magistrate Grade One in 1992. He went on to work as Chief Magistrate, then as Deputy Registrar and then Registrar of the High Court.

Later in 2000, he was promoted to the position of chief registrar of the Judiciary, serving in that capacity until 2004. In 2004 he was appointed to the bench, as a member of the High Court of Uganda. He has special interest in Civil Law.

Judicial career
He was appointed as a judge of the High Court of Uganda in 2004. He served as the head of the civil division of the high court. In February 2018, Musota was appointed to the Uganda Court of Appeal, and was successfully vetted by the Ugandan parliament.

Other considerations
Stephen Musota served on the Task Force on the Reforms of Criminal and Civil Laws in 2015, to which he was appointed by the Chief Justice of Uganda. In 2016, he was appointed to the Case Backlog Reduction Committee of the Uganda Judiciary. In 2017, he was appointed as a member of the Committee on Reform of Legislation on Civil Procedures in Uganda.

See also
Supreme Court of Uganda
Constitutional Court of Uganda

References

External links
High court dismisses sim-card registration application As of 18 May 2017.

20th-century Ugandan judges
21st-century Ugandan judges
1959 births
Living people
Makerere University alumni
Law Development Centre alumni
Justices of the Court of Appeal of Uganda